Nabilah Lubis (born Nabilah ‘Abdel Fattah,  on March 14, 1942) is an Indonesian philologist, writer, translator and lecturer. Nabilah is an Egyptian woman who was married by a Batak Mandailing man from Medan named Burhanuddin Umar Lubis, so she changed her last name to Nabilah Lubis.

Career
After Lubis completed her doctoral education at the Syarif Hidayatullah State Islamic Institute (IAIN Jakarta, Syarif Hidayatullah State Islamic University Jakarta) in 1992, she became the first female doctorate at IAIN Jakarta. Two years later, in 1994, professor Quraish Shihab as chancellor of IAIN Jakarta appointed her as Dean of the Faculty of Adab and Humanities. Lubis retired from her position as Professor at the Faculty of Adab and Humanities at UIN Jakarta in 2007. She is the Expert Council of the Muslimat Nahdlatul Ulama for the period 2016–2021 with Sinta Nuriyah Wahid and eight other people.

References

Bibliography

Further reading

External links

 

Egyptian emigrants to Indonesia
Indonesian people of Egyptian descent
Mandailing people
Indonesian Muslims
Academics from Cairo
Cairo University alumni
Syarif Hidayatullah State Islamic University Jakarta alumni
Leiden University alumni
1942 births
Living people